The Department of State of Puerto Rico was created in July 1952 and is responsible of promoting the cultural, political, and economical relations between Puerto Rico, other jurisdictions of the United States and foreign countries.

History 
The Department of State of Puerto Rico was established by section 6 of Article IV of the constitution passed on July 25, 1952.

The Department headquarters is located in the Old Palace of the Royal Intendency (Antiguo Palacio de la Real Intendencia) in Old San Juan with regional offices in Arecibo, Fajardo and Ponce.

Secretaries

 1952–1964: Roberto Sánchez Vilella
 1965–1966: Carlos J. Lastra
 1966–1969: Guillermo Irizarry
 1969–1973: Carlos Fernando Chardón
 1973–1974: Victor Pons
 1975–1977: Juan A. Albors
 1977–1979: Reinaldo Paniagua Diez
 1979–1981: Pedro R. Vazquez
 1981–1985: Carlos S. Quirós
 1985–1988: Héctor Luis Acevedo
 1988–1988: Alfonso Lopez Char
 1988–1990: Sila M. Calderon
 1990–1992: Antonio J. Colorado
 1992–1992: Salvador M. Padilla Escabi
 1993–1995: Baltasar Corrada del Rio
 1995–1999: Norma Burgos
 1999–2001: Angel Morey
 2001–2003: Ferdinand Mercado
 2004–2004: Jose Izquierdo Encarnacion
 2005–2005: Marisara Pont Marchese
 2005–2009: Fernando J. Bonilla
 2009–2013: Kenneth D. McClintock
 2013–2015: David Bernier
 2015–2016: Víctor Suárez Meléndez
 2017–2019: Luis G. Rivera Marín
 2019: Pedro Pierluisi 
 2019–2020: Elmer L. Román González
 2020–2021: Raúl Márquez Hernández

See also
 List of company registers#District/Territorial registries (Puerto Rico Trademark Office)

References

 

Executive departments of the government of Puerto Rico